

Incumbents

Federal government 
President: Muhammad Zia-ul-Haq
Chief Justice: Sheikh Anwarul Haq (until 25 March), Mohammad Haleem

Governors 
Governor of Balochistan: Rahimuddin Khan 
Governor of Khyber Pakhtunkhwa: Fazle Haq 
Governor of Punjab: Ghulam Jilani Khan 
Governor of Sindh: S.M. Abbasi

Events

March
 2 March 1981 –  Pakistan International Airlines Flight 326 is hijacked by armed men belonging to Al-Zulfiqar. At the time, it was the longest hijacking in history.

See also
1980 in Pakistan
Other events of 1981
1982 in Pakistan
List of Pakistani films of 1981
Timeline of Pakistani history

References 

 
Pakistan